General elections were held in the Islamabad Capital Territory on Wednesday, 25 July 2018 to elect the 3 members of 15th National Assembly from Islamabad. 

The Pakistan Tehreek-e-Insaf (PTI) swept Islamabad winning all 3 seats with huge margin.

Candidates 
A total number of 69 Candidates, including 33 Independents, contested for the 3 National Assembly Seats from Islamabad.

Result 

Party Wise

Constituency wise

By-election 
After the General Elections, the chairman of the PTI, Imran Khan vacated NA-53 in favour of NA-95 (Mianwali-I). By-elections were held on 14 October 2018. Ali Nawaz Awan of the PTI won the seat by a margin of 18,630 votes.

References

Islamabad
Politics of Islamabad
2010s in Islamabad